Compsoctena brandbergensis is a moth in the family Eriocottidae. It was described by Wolfram Mey in 2007. It is found in Namibia.

References

Endemic fauna of Namibia
Moths described in 2007
Compsoctena
Lepidoptera of Namibia